Evangelia Chatziefraimoglou (born ) is a retired Greek female volleyball player. She was part of the Greece women's national volleyball team.

She won the silver medal at the 2005 Mediterranean Games. She participated in the 2006 FIVB Volleyball Women's World Championship.

At club level, she played most notably for Greek powerhouse Olympiacos Piraeus (2007–2008), with whom she reached the quarter-finals of the 2007-2008 CEV Women's Challenge Cup.

References

External links

1975 births
Living people
Greek women's volleyball players
Olympiacos Women's Volleyball players
Place of birth missing (living people)
Mediterranean Games silver medalists for Greece
Mediterranean Games medalists in volleyball
Competitors at the 2005 Mediterranean Games
21st-century Greek women